Villeneuve is a town and comune in the Aosta Valley region of northwestern Italy. It is the gate of Gran Paradiso National Park the oldest Italian national park. Nearby lie the ruins of the medieval castle, Châtel-Argent.

International relations

Twin towns — Sister cities
Villeneuve is twinned with:
 Aigueblanche, France

External links
Tourism information (Aosta Region official site)
Tourism and administration information (Villeneuve city official site)

Cities and towns in Aosta Valley